George Tabb is a founding member and song writer in such punk bands as Roach Motel, Atoms for Peace (a Gainesville Florida '80's band, not the more recent "supergroup"), False Prophets, Letch Patrol, Gynocologists, Iron Prostate and Furious George.

George was a resident of Lower Manhattan during the September 11, 2001 attacks. Since then he has been diagnosed with many "unexplained" and life-threatening illnesses that a normal person should not have. They have amongst other things contributed to his divorce, and his debilitating health. He has become an activist and has been featured on various news programs, such as MSNBC, to make his story known.

Bibliography
Playing Right Field:  A Jew Grows In Greenwich
Surfing Armageddon:  Fascists, Fishnets and Body Fluids In Florida
Take My Life Please - Chroniques

External links

Interview with George Tabb at Twenty-Four Hours

American punk rock musicians
American health activists
Living people
Jewish American musicians
Jews in punk rock
Year of birth missing (living people)
Leon High School alumni
21st-century American Jews